Empresa de Tecnologia da Informação e Comunicação do Mun. SP (PRODAM) is the state company owned by the municipal government of São Paulo, Brazil, which is in charge of all computer infrastructure and data processing tasks in the city.

Companies based in São Paulo